Walking on Locusts is the thirteenth solo studio album by Welsh musician John Cale, released on 24 September 1996 by Hannibal Records. Cale worked with several guest musicians including David Byrne, Moe Tucker, Dave Soldier with the Soldier String Quartet, B. J. Cole and Erik Sanko. Cale claimed the album evolved from touring with New York City's Soldier String Quartet. "Some Friends" was about his former Velvet Underground colleague, Sterling Morrison, who died unexpectedly the previous year.

Track listing

Personnel
Musicians
 John Cale − acoustic guitar, keyboards, vocals
 David Byrne − guitar on "Crazy Egypt"
 Maureen Tucker − drums on "Dancing Undercover" and "Set Me Free"
 Erik Sanko − bass
 Dawn Buckholz − cello
 B. J. Cole − pedal steel guitar
 Mark Deffenbaugh − vocals, harmonica on "Set Me Free", "Crazy Egypt" and "Circus"
 Ibrahim Hakhmoun − drums, metal castanets
 Hassan Hakmoun − Moroccan drums
 Daisy Lignelli, Eden Cale, Joanne O'Brien, Napua Davoy, Susan Didericksen, Tiyé Giraud − backing vocals
 Martha Mooke − viola
 Ben Neill − "mutantrumpet" 
 Ben Perowsky − drums
 Todd Reynolds − violin
 E.J. Rodriguez − conga, percussion
 Dave Soldier − violin, string arrangements
 David Tronzo − guitar
 The Lafayette Inspirational Ensemble − choir
 The Soldier String Quartet − strings
Oliver Williams − choral arrangements
Jack Wall, John Cale − vocal arrangements

Production and artwork
 John Cale − producer
 Jack Wall − engineer
 Stephen Wolstenholme − design
 Richard Burbridge − cover photography

References

External links
 

John Cale albums
1996 albums
Albums produced by John Cale
Hannibal Records albums